The Secret of the Nautilus (known as The Mystery of the Nautilus in the US) is a 2002 adventure video game, inspired by Jules Verne's science fiction novel Twenty Thousand Leagues Under the Sea. It was developed by Cryo Interactive and released for Microsoft Windows based PCs.

Development 
The characters in The Secret of the Nautilus are based on original 19th century engravings as published in Jules Verne's novel Twenty Thousand Leagues Under the Sea, despite the game taking place in the 21st century. These characters include Némo, and a giant octopus. The game is similar in theme to The Adventure Company's later games which include Return to Mysterious Island, Return to Mysterious Island 2, and Voyage: Inspired by Jules Verne.

An official press release launching the game was published in Aachen in January 2002. In February 2002, Adventure Archiv released a preview and reported the game was due to be released on European shelves in March of that year. The preview displayed the main character with new facial features. Cryo Interactive also assigned the project to the new development studio T-Bot, which incorporated a new game design. The game was also reported to be coming out on CD and DVD for the MAC, however the release dates of these versions were not yet known.

Plot 
The game is set under the sea in the 21st century, where during a scientific assignment, a young oceanographer enters into a strange type of submarine hidden on an undersea rock shelf. The vessel turns out to be the famous Nautilus which was abandoned a great many years earlier by Captain Nemo.

Gameplay 
The game plays as a Myst-clone first-person adventure game, in which the player navigates through a series of computer generated screens to interact with the environment and solve puzzles.

Reception 
By 2004, global sales of The Secret of the Nautilus had surpassed 117,000 copies.

Süddeutsche Zeitung felt that while the game would attract fans of Jules Verne, they would become dismayed by the game's "combintion puzzles". Reviewer Four Fat Chicks felt the small hotspots, and timed sections let the game down.

References

External links 
 The Secret of the Nautilus at Microïds
 at Metacritic

2002 video games
Adventure games
Cryo Interactive games
DreamCatcher Interactive games
Microïds games
Windows games
Windows-only games
Works based on Twenty Thousand Leagues Under the Sea
Video games based on works by Jules Verne
Video games developed in France
Video games with underwater settings
Single-player video games